The Calgary Rage are a women's football team in the Western Women's Canadian Football League competing in the Western Conference. When the team was first formed, it was known as the Calgary Rockies. 
Games are played at Shouldice Athletic Park.

Year by year

IFAF competitors
The following recognizes women from the Calgary Rage that competed in the IFAF Women's World Football Championships

2010
Krista Michelle Wighton
Kora-Lea Hooker
Erin Walton

2013
Susie Childress (reserved roster)
Alanna Doyle (Injured, did not play)
Annie Tremblay
Erin Walton

Community involvement
Currently, many of the players also volunteer as ushers at Calgary Stampeders home games.
Also more players are getting involved with Coaching around Calgary with different levels of programs ranging from pee-wee football to high school. On September 1, 2013, several members of the Rage roster competed in the Calgary Pride Parade.

References

Rage
Women's sports in Canada
Women in Alberta
2009 establishments in Alberta
Sports clubs established in 2009